The "Day of Deliverance" was a celebration day marked by the All-India Muslim League and others on 22 December 1939 during the Indian independence movement. It was led by Muslim League president Muhammad Ali Jinnah, and intended to rejoice the resignation of all members of the rival Congress party from provincial and central offices in protest over their not having been consulted over the decision to enter World War II alongside Britain.

Historical background

In 1938 and 1939, the Muslim League tried to bring light to the grievances of Muslims and Muslim groups in Indian states run by Congress governments; the effort led to documents like the PIRPUR REPORT : 1938, Muslim sufferings under The Congress rule by A. K. Fazlul Huq and SHARIF REPORT (Bihar Province) : 1938, documenting pro-Hindu and anti-Muslim bias under Congress governments.

Viceroy Linlithgow declared India at war with Nazi Germany on 3 September 1939. The Indian National Congress, the dominant political party of Subcontinent, objected strongly to the declaration of war without prior consultation with Indians. The Congress Working Committee suggested that it would cooperate if there were a central Indian national government formed, and a commitment made to India's independence after the war. The Muslim League promised its support to the British, with Jinnah calling on Muslims to help the Raj by "honourable co-operation at the critical and difficult juncture," while asking the Viceroy for increased protection for Muslims.

Congress considered Linlithgow's subsequent response "wholly unsatisfactory and calculated to rouse resentment among all those who are anxious to gain.India's independence," and on 22 October 1939, "call[ed] upon all Congress ministries to tender their resignations." The unilateral protest resignation was supported by Jawaharlal Nehru, but less so by Mahatma Gandhi, who felt that it would strengthen both unwanted British wartime militarization and the Muslim League. Both Viceroy Linlithgow and Muhammad Ali Jinnah were pleased with the resignations.

Jinnah's appeal 

On 2 December 1939, Jinnah put out an appeal, calling for Indian Muslims to celebrate 22 December 1939 as a "Day of Deliverance" from Congress:

Congress reaction 

The proposed Day of Deliverance was criticized as being divisive. On 9 December 1939, Gandhi appealed to Jinnah to end the observance in light of pending Congress/Muslim league unity discussions, and in anticipation of third party review of Muslim League allegations made about Congress' treatment of Muslims.

Nehru exchanged several letters with Jinnah between 9–14 December 1939, offering to deal with specific allegations of anti-Muslim actions, but the discussions fell through because Nehru refused to disassociate Congress from Indian Muslims unaffiliated with the Muslim League, and concluded that:

The celebration was also criticized by prominent senior Muslim members of Congress, including Abul Kalam Azad, who stated:

Observance 

The Day of Deliverance was celebrated in many parts of India by Muslim League supporters, as well some non-Muslim Congress opponents. The latter included the All-India Depressed Classes Association, Dalit leader B. R. Ambedkar and the Independent Labour Party, E. V. Ramasami, as well as some Parsis, and Anglo-Indians.

Before the Day of Deliverance events, Ambedkar stated that he was interested in participating: "I read Mr. Jinnah's statement and I felt ashamed to have allowed him to steal a march over me and rob me of the language and the sentiment which I, more than Mr. Jinnah, was entitled to use." He went on to suggest that the communities he worked with were twenty times more oppressed by Congress policies than were Indian Muslims; he clarified that he was criticizing Congress, and not all Hindus.

Jinnah and Ambedkar jointly addressed the heavily attended Day of Deliverance event in Bhindi Bazaar, Bombay, where both expressed "fiery" criticisms of the Congress party, and according to one observer, suggested that Islam and Hinduism were irreconcilable.

E. V. Ramasami of the Justice Party called upon his party and all Dravidians to celebrate 22 December "on a grand scale...to rid the country of the menace of the Congress."

Meetings and rallies were held by Muslims in various parts of Bengal, which was a step in the development of Bengali Muslim separatist politics.

Remembrance 

The Day of Deliverance is included in the Pakistani Federal Public Service Commission and Civil Service Commission's competitive examinations.

References 

1939 in India
Indian independence movement
Pakistan Movement